Airport code may refer to:

International Air Transport Association airport code, a three-letter code which is used in passenger reservation, ticketing, and baggage-handling systems
International Civil Aviation Organization airport code, a four-letter code which is used by air-traffic control systems and for airports that do not have an IATA airport code

See also
 Airline codes
 Location identifier